= Dhamne S.Bailur =

Dhamne S Bailur
- Village
- Country: India
- State: Karnataka
- District: Belagavi
- Talukas: Belagavi

Languages
  - Official: [Marathi]
- Time zone: UTC+5:30 (IST)
- Postal code: 591108

Dhamne S.Bailur is a village in Belagavi district in the state of Karanataka, India. It is an exclave of Karnataka and is surrounded by the state of Maharashtra.

== About ==
According to the 2011 census, Dhamne S Bailur village is located in Belagavi Tehsil of Belagavi district in Karnataka. It is situated 25 km (16 mi) away from Belagavi. As per 2009 stats, Belawatti is the gram panchayat of Dhamne S Bailur.

== Geography ==
The total geographical area of village is 1,664.15 hectares (4,112.2 acres). Dhamne S Bailur has a total population of 528 people. There are about 93 houses in Dhamne S Bailur village. Belagavi is the nearest town to Dhamne S Bailur and is approximately 25 km (16 mi) away.
